The Potawatomi Islands is the most common historic name given to the string of islands that delineate the transition from Green Bay to Lake Michigan, one of the Great Lakes. The archipelago is also termed the "Grand Traverse Islands".

The largest of the islands is Washington Island, in Door County, Wisconsin. Washington Island accounts for 62% of the islands' combined surface area. Others include Plum Island, Detroit Island,  Hog Island, Pilot Island, and Rock Island in Wisconsin and Little Gull Island, Summer Island, Little Summer Island, Poverty Island, Rocky Island, and St. Martin Island in Michigan.

The broader term "Green Bay Islands" is used when additional islands located to the southwest are included in the island group.

History

In the 19th century, a fishing industry was centered around the Potowatomi Islands. Areas where fishing was most active were termed fishing grounds, and were termed the Sack Bay, Summer Island, St. Martin Island, and Washington Island grounds. During the peak of the industry in the 1840s and 1850s, approximately 20 fishing families lived year-round on Summer Island and several more on Rock Island. Following the introduction of the steam tug in 1869 and also as the whitefish industry declined, most fishermen left the smaller islands. Those who continued to fish moved especially to Washington Island and harbors in Big and Little Bay de Noc. Switching from the sail-powered sloop to the steam tug expanded the fishermens' ranges and allowed them to live further from the fish they caught.

Municipalities
The Potawatomi Islands form the Town of Washington in Door County, Wisconsin and part of Fairbanks Township in Delta County, Michigan.

See also
Lake Michigan § Islands
Door Peninsula § Reefs and shoals in Door County waters

Peninsulas
Garden Peninsula (to the north)
Door Peninsula (to the south)

Nearby and adjacent waters
Porte des Morts south of the islands
Big Bay de Noc
Little Bay de Noc
Green Bay (Lake Michigan)

Counties
Delta County, Michigan (to the north)
Door County, Wisconsin (to the south)

Protected areas
Green Bay National Wildlife Refuge
Rock Island State Park
Gravel Island National Wildlife Refuge
Shingleton Forest Management Unit, 1,488 acres on Big Summer and Little Summer Islands

History
Wisconsin v. Michigan, a 1936 dispute involving which state or states the Potawatomi Islands belong to; this was decided by the Supreme Court

Notes

External links 
 Friends of the Grand Traverse Islands
 Friends of Plum and Pilot Islands
 Summer Islands Management Area, Michigan Department of Natural Resources

Islands of Delta County, Michigan
Islands of Lake Michigan in Michigan
Islands of Door County, Wisconsin
Islands of Lake Michigan in Wisconsin